Hellinsia paccha is a moth of the family Pterophoridae. It is found in Ecuador.

The wingspan is 14–16 mm. Adults are on wing in September.

Etymology
The name refers to Paccha, an Inca princess.

References

Moths described in 2011
paccha
Moths of South America